Daria Sergeyevna Elizarova (born 28 January 1991) is a Russian gymnast who formerly competed for Uzbekistan for a short time. She was born in Moscow, Russia.

Career 
She started competing for Uzbekistan in 2010. At the Asian Games in Guangzhou, she came fourth in the all-round and third in the team. At the event final of floor, she came eighth with a score of 12.4.

Competitive history

References

Russian female artistic gymnasts
Uzbekistani female artistic gymnasts
Asian Games medalists in gymnastics
Gymnasts at the 2010 Asian Games
1991 births
Living people
Asian Games bronze medalists for Uzbekistan
Medalists at the 2010 Asian Games
Universiade medalists in gymnastics
Universiade gold medalists for Russia
Universiade silver medalists for Russia
Universiade bronze medalists for Russia
Medalists at the 2015 Summer Universiade
Medalists at the 2017 Summer Universiade
Gymnasts from Moscow